Zdzisław Antczak (20 November 1947 – 28 February 2019) was a Polish handball player who competed in the 1972 Summer Olympics and in the 1976 Summer Olympics. 

In 1972 he was part of the Polish team which finished tenth. Four years later he won the bronze medal with the Polish team.

References

External links
Profile 

1947 births
2019 deaths
People from Legnica County
Sportspeople from Lower Silesian Voivodeship
Polish male handball players
Handball players at the 1972 Summer Olympics
Handball players at the 1976 Summer Olympics
Olympic handball players of Poland
Olympic bronze medalists for Poland
Olympic medalists in handball
Medalists at the 1976 Summer Olympics
Expatriate handball players
Polish expatriate sportspeople in Belgium
20th-century Polish people